Fetters is a 1961 Czech drama film directed by Karel Kachyňa. It was entered into the 2nd Moscow International Film Festival.

Cast
 Radovan Lukavský as Dr. Jirí Klimes
 Blanka Bohdanová as Sylva
 Jirina Svorcová as Magda Muzikárová
 Zdeněk Štěpánek as Klimes
 Jarmila Kurandová as Aunt
 Zdenek Kutil as Co-op chairman
 Milada Vitova as Vintrová
 Luděk Munzar as Dr. Nemecek
 Ilja Prachar as Dr. Martínek
 Petr Kostka as Elegant man
 Josef Koza as Truksa
 Milan Holubár as Snajdr

References

External links
 

1961 films
1961 drama films
1960s Czech-language films
Czechoslovak black-and-white films
Czech drama films
Czechoslovak drama films
1960s Czech films